Unami Club Polideportivo is a Spanish football club based in Segovia in the autonomous community of Castile and León.

History
Unami was founded in 1983, with their name meaning Unión de Amigos (Friends' Union). The club initially joined futsal tournaments, opening their football section in 2004.

After achieving two consecutive promotions, the club first reached Tercera División in May 2012. After finishing in the 14th position in his first season, they suffered relegation on 11 May 2014, after a 6–3 loss to CD Bupolsa.

After winning their group in the Primera Regional in the 2020–21 campaign, Unami qualified for the 2021–22 Copa del Rey. They defeated CD Aldeano in the preliminary rounds before being knocked out by Deportivo Alavés.

Season to season

2 seasons in Tercera División
1 season in Tercera Federación

References

External links
 

1983 establishments in Spain
Association football clubs established in 1983
Football clubs in Castile and León
Sport in Segovia